Fournes-en-Weppes is a commune in the Nord department in northern France. It is part of the Métropole Européenne de Lille.  Hitler spent half of his war time service in World War I here.

Heraldry

See also
Communes of the Nord department

References

Fournesenweppes
French Flanders